Sebastian Brant (also Brandt) (1457/1458 – 10 May 1521) was a German  humanist and satirist. He is best known for his satire Das Narrenschiff  (The Ship of Fools).

Biography
Brant was born in either 1457 or 1458 in Strasbourg to  innkeeper Diebold Brant and Barbara Brant (née Rickler). He entered the University of Basel in 1475, initially studying philosophy and then transferring to the school of law. From 1483 he began teaching at the university and completed his doctorate in law in 1489. In 1485 he had married Elisabeth Bürg, the daughter of a cutler in the town. Elisabeth bore him seven children. Keen for his eldest son Onophrius to become a humanist, he taught him Latin in the cradle and enrolled him in the university at the age of seven.

Brant first attracted attention in humanistic circles by his Neo-Latin poetry but, realising that this gave him only a limited audience, he began translating his own work and the Latin poems of others into German, publishing them through the press of his friend Johann Bergmann, from which appeared his best known German work, the satirical Das Narrenschiff (Ship of Fools, 1494), the popularity and influence of which were not limited to Germany. In this allegory, the author lashes the weaknesses and vices of his time. It is an episodic work in which a ship laden with and steered by fools goes to the fools' paradise of Narragonia. Here he conceives Saint Grobian, whom he imagines to be the patron saint of vulgar and coarse people. He was employed by the printer Johann Amerbach with whom he collaborated in the publications of the works of christian fathers Augustine's and Ambrose. In jurisprudence, he also worked on the Corpus Juridici canonici,  which Amerbach was to print jointly with Johannes Froben in 1500. He was very close with several printers of Basel and it is assumed that of all the books that were published in Basel in the last quarter of the 15th century, Brant worked on a third.  

Most of Brant's important writing, including many works on civil and canon law, were written while he was living in Basel. He returned to Strasbourg in 1500, where he was made syndic and remained  for the rest of his life. In 1503 he secured the influential position of chancellor (stadtschreiber) and his engagement in public affairs prevented him from pursuing literature further. Brant made several petitions to the Emperor Maximilian to drive back the Turks in order to save the West. In the same spirit, he had sung the praises of Ferdinand II of Aragon in 1492 for having conquered the Moors and unified Spain. A staunch proponent of German cultural nationalism, he believed that moral reform was necessary for the security of the Empire against the Ottoman threat.

Although essentially conservative in his religious views, Brant's eyes were open to abuses in the church. He published the Narrenschiff in 1494, printed by Michael Furter. Alexander Barclay's Ship of Fools (1509) is a free imitation into early Tudor period English of the German poem, and a Latin version by Jakob Locher (1497) was hardly less popular than the original. Cock Lorell's Bote (printed by Wynkyn de Worde, c. 1510) was a shorter imitation of the Narrenschiff. In this work Cock Lorell, a notorious fraudulent tinker of the period, gathers round him a rascally collection of tradesmen and sets off to sail through England.

Among Brant's many other works was his compilation of fables and other popular stories, published in 1501 under the title Aesopi Appologi sive Mythologi cum quibusdam Carminum et Fabularum additionibus, the beauty of whose production is still appreciated. Though based on Heinrich Steinhöwel's 1476 edition of Aesop, the Latin prose was emended by Brant, who also added verse commentaries with his characteristic combination of wit and style. The second part of the work is entirely new, consisting of riddles, additional fables culled from varied sources, and accounts of miracles and wonders of nature both from his own times and reaching back to antiquity.

The letters by Brant that have survived show that he was in correspondence with Peter Schott, Johann Bergmann von Olpe, Emperor Maximilian, Thomas Murner, Konrad Peutinger, Willibald Pirckheimer, Johannes Reuchlin, Beatus Rhenanus, Jakob Wimpfeling and Ulrich Zasius.

See also
 Ship of Fools

References

Editions
 Das Narrenschiff, Studienausgabe, ed. by Joachim Knape (Stuttgart: Reclam, 2005)
 Online facsimile of the original 
 Edwin H. Zeydel's 1944 translation of The Ship of Fools, of which there is a limited selection on Google Books
 Aesopi Appologi, an unpaged facsimile on Google Books; a page by page online facsimile with short German descriptions from Mannheim University

Further reading
C. H. Herford, The Literary Relations of England and Germany in the 16th Century (1886) discusses the influence of Brant in England.
John W. Van Cleve, Sebastian Brant's 'The Ship of Fools' in Critical Perspective, 1800-1991 (Columbia, SC: Camden House, 1993).

External links

 
 
 

1457 births
1521 deaths
Writers from Strasbourg
German Roman Catholics
German satirists
Roman Catholic writers
Christian humanists
German male non-fiction writers
15th-century German jurists
16th-century German jurists